Tikveš Hydro Power Plant is a large power plant in Kavadarci Municipality, North Macedonia that has two turbines with a nominal capacity of 46 MW each having a total capacity of 92 MW. The purpose of the dam is to store water for irrigation but also to generate power.

References

Hydroelectric power stations in North Macedonia
Dams in North Macedonia
Dams completed in 1968
Rock-filled dams
Kavadarci Municipality